Kraft Prinz zu Hohenlohe-Ingelfingen (2 January 1827 – 16 January 1892) was a Prussian general and military writer during the time of the German Empire.

Early life 

Kraft Karl August zu Hohenlohe-Ingelfingen was born at Koschentin in Upper Silesia. He was the son of Prince Adolf zu Hohenlohe-Ingelfingen (1797–1873), and a grandson of Frederick Louis, Prince of Hohenlohe-Ingelfingen (1746–1818), who commanded the Prussians at Jena.

Educated with great rigour, owing to the impoverishment of the family estates during the Napoleonic Wars, Kraft was sent into the Prussian Army.  There, he was commissioned to the artillery as the least expensive arm of the service.  He joined the Prussian Guard artillery in 1845, and it was soon discovered that he had unusual aptitudes as an artillery officer.  For a time his fellow officers resented the presence of a prince, until it was found that he made no attempt to use his social position to secure advancement.

Promotions 

After serving as a military attaché in Vienna and on the Transylvanian frontier during the Crimean War, Kraft was made a captain on the general staff, and in 1856 personal aide-de-camp to the king, remaining, however, in close touch with the artillery.  In 1864, having become major and then lieutenant colonel, he resigned the staff appointments to become commander of the new Guard Field Artillery regiment. In the following year, he became colonel.

Kraft saw his first real active service in 1866. In the hold advance of the Guard corps on the Austrian right wing at Königgrätz during the Austro-Prussian War, he led the Guard reserve artillery with success, and after the short war ended he turned his energies, now fortified by experience, to the tactical training of the Prussian artillery.

In 1868 Kraft was made a major-general and assigned to command the Guard artillery brigade.  In this capacity he gained great distinction during the Franco-Prussian War, especially at Gravelotte and Sedan. He was in control of the artillery attack on the fortifications of Paris. In 1873 he was placed in command of an infantry division, and three years later was promoted to lieutenant-general.  While he retired in 1879, he was made general of infantry in 1883 and then general of artillery in 1889.

Writings 
Kraft's military writings were numerous, and amongst them several have become classics.  These are Briefe über Artillerie (English translation  Letters on Artillery, 1887); Briefe über Strategie (1877; Letters on Strategy, 1898); and Gespräche über Reiterei (1887; Conversations on Cavalry). The Briefe über Infanterie and Briefe über Kavallerie (Letters on Infantry, Letters on Cavalry, 1889) are of less importance, though interesting as a reflection of prevailing German ideas.

Memoirs 
Kraft's memoirs (Aus meinem Leben) were prepared in retirement near Dresden, and the first volume (1897) created such a sensation that eight years were allowed to elapse before the publication was continued. Kraft died near Dresden in 1892.

Orders and decorations

Literature 
 Kurt von Priesdorff: Soldatisches Führertum. Band 8, Hanseatische Verlagsanstalt Hamburg, ohne Jahr, pp. 76–79.
 Bernhard von Poten: Hohenlohe-Ingelfingen, Kraft Prinz zu. In: Allgemeine Deutsche Biographie (ADB). Band 50, Duncker & Humblot, Leipzig 1905, pp. 444–446.

External links

References

1827 births
1892 deaths
People from the Province of Silesia
People from Lubliniec County
House of Hohenlohe-Ingelfingen
German princes
Prussian people of the Austro-Prussian War
German military personnel of the Franco-Prussian War
Generals of Infantry (Prussia)
Generals of Artillery (Prussia)
Recipients of the Pour le Mérite (military class)
Recipients of the Iron Cross (1870), 1st class
Recipients of the Military Merit Order (Bavaria)
Recipients of the Military Merit Cross (Mecklenburg-Schwerin), 1st class
Commandeurs of the Légion d'honneur
Recipients of the Order of St. Anna, 1st class
Recipients of the Order of St. George of the Fourth Degree